Richard Quain may refer to:
 Richard Quain (Irish physician) (1816–1898) 
 Richard Quain (English surgeon) (1800–1887), English anatomist and surgeon